Maher "Mauro" Hamza is a fencing coach who was born in Cairo, Egypt. In 1994, Hamza coached at Texas A&M for one year. In August 1999, he established Salle Mauro in Houston, Texas. Hamza also served as Fencing Program Coordinator at Rice University from 1998 to 2014. He spent three years serving the Southwest fencing community as volunteer Chairman of the Gulf Coast Division.

Hamza was head coach of the 2001 United States Junior/Cadet national fencing team. Hamza was the Egyptian Olympic coach for the men’s and women’s foil teams at the Athens Olympics in 2004, and was the United States Fencing Association Men’s Foil National Coach 2009-10; then USA Foil Director for Men’s and Women’s National teams in 2010-11. In 2009, December 26 was declared “Mauro Hamza Day” by Houston mayor Bill White in recognition of his development of the sport of fencing in Houston.

References

External links
 Salle Mauro

Living people
Egyptian male foil fencers
Year of birth missing (living people)
Rice University staff
Fencing coaches
Sportspeople from Houston